Sustainable Development Goal 7 (SDG 7 or Global Goal 7) is one of 17 Sustainable Development Goals established by the United Nations General Assembly in 2015. It aims to "Ensure access to affordable, reliable, sustainable and modern energy for all." Access to energy is a important pillar for the wellbeing of the people as well as for economic development and poverty alleviation.

The goal has five targets to be achieved by 2030. Progress towards the targets is measured by six indicators. Three out of the five targets are outcome targets: Universal access to modern energy; increase global percentage of renewable energy; double the improvement in energy efficiency. The remaining two targets are means of implementation targets: to promote access to research, technology and investments in clean energy; and expand and upgrade energy services for developing countries. In other words, these targets include access to affordable and reliable energy while increasing the share of renewable energy in the global energy mix. They also focus on improving energy efficiency, international cooperation and investment in clean energy infrastructure. 

According to a review report in 2019, some progress towards achieving SDG 7 is being made, but many of the targets of SDG 7 will not be met. SDG 7 and SDG 13 (climate action) are closely related.

Problem description 
 

SDG 7 is tackling the problem of the high number of people globally who live without access to electricity or clean cooking solutions (0.8 billion and 2.4 billion people, respectively, in 2020). Energy is needed for many activities, for example jobs and transport, food security, health and education.

People that are hard to read with electricity and clean cooking solutions include those who live in remote areas or are internally displaced people, or those who live in urban slums or marginalized communities.

Targets, indicators and progress

SDG 7 has five targets, measured with five indicators, which are to be achieved by 2030. Three out of the five targets are "outcome targets", and two are "means of achieving targets".

Target 7.1: Universal access to modern energy 
The first target of SDG 7 is Target 7.1: "By 2030, ensure universal access to affordable, reliable and modern energy services".

This target has two indicators:

 Indicator 7.1.1: Proportion of population with access to electricity
 Indicator 7.1.2: Proportion of population with primary reliance on clean fuels and technology. 

A report from 2019 found that India, Bangladesh, and Kenya had made good progress with supplying more of their people with electricity. Globally, there are now (2020) 800 million people still without electricity, compared with 1.2 billion people in 2010.

There are several options to tackle this problem, for example private sector financing and ensuring that rural areas get access to electricity. This may involve decentralized renewable energy.

Women are disproportionately affected by indoor air pollution caused by the use of fuels such as coal and wood indoors. Reasons for not changing over to clean cooking solutions can include higher fuel costs and the need to change cooking processes.

Target 7.2: Increase global percentage of renewable energy 

The second target of SDG 7 is Target 7.2: "By 2030, increase substantially the share of renewable energy in the global energy mix."

It has only one indicator: Indicator 7.2.1 is the "Renewable energy share in the total final energy consumption".    

Data from 2016 showed that the share of renewable energy compared to total energy consumption was 17.5%.

Target 7.3: Double the improvement in energy efficiency 

The third target of SDG 7 is Target 7.3: "By 2030, double the global rate of improvement in energy efficiency".

It has one indicator: Indicator 7.3.1 is the "Energy intensity measured in terms of primary energy and GDP".  

In general, energy efficiency has been going up in recent years, in particular in China. Governments can help with this process for example by providing suitable financial incentives and by helping people access information about energy efficiency.

Target 7.a: Promote access to research, technology and investments in clean energy 

The fourth target of SDG 7 is Target 7.a: "By 2030, enhance international cooperation to facilitate access to clean energy research and technology, including renewable energy, energy efficiency and advanced and cleaner fossil-fuel technology, and promote investment in energy infrastructure and clean energy technology".

It has one indicator: Indicator 7.4.1 is the "International financial flows to developing countries in support of clean energy research and development and renewable energy production, including in hybrid systems".  

There is twice the amount of international financing for renewable energy going to developing countries in 2017 compared to 2010. In 2017 most of this financing (nearly half) went to hydropower and nearly 20% to solar power projects.

More investments are needed for global energy access, namely for electrification and clean cooking: A report in 2021 state that "the financing community is failing to deliver on SDG7".

Target 7.b: Expand and upgrade energy services for developing countries 
The fifth target of SDG 7 is formulated as: "Target 7.b: By 2030, expand infrastructure and upgrade technology for supplying modern and sustainable energy services for all in developing countries, in particular least developed countries, small island developing States, and land-locked developing countries, in accordance with their respective programs of support."

It has one indicator: Indicator 7.5.1 is the "Investments in energy efficiency as a proportion of GDP and the amount of foreign direct investment in financial transfer for infrastructure and technology to sustainable development services".

As of August 2020, there is no data available for this indicator.

It was reported in 2020 that Indicator 7.b.1 might be removed as it is identical with indicator 12.1.1 of SDG 12.

Custodian agencies 
Custodian agencies are in charge of reporting on the following indicators:

 Indicators 7.1.1 and 7.1.2: World Bank (WB) and World Health Organization (WHO).
 Indicator 7.2.1: Department of Economic and Social Affairs-Statistics Division (DESA/UNDP), International Energy Agency (IEA) and International Renewable Energy Agency (IRENA).
 Indicator 7.3.1 are Department of Economic and Social Affairs-Statistics Division (DESA/UNDP) and International Energy Agency (IEA).
 Indicator 7.a.1: Organization for Economic Cooperation and Development (OECD) and International Renewable Energy Agency (IRENA).
 Indicator 7.b.1: International Energy Agency (IEA).

Overall progress and monitoring 
The UN High-Level Political Forum on Sustainable Development (HLPF) meets every year for global monitoring of the SDGs, under the auspices of the United Nations economic and Social Council. High-level progress reports for all the SDGs are published by the United Nations Secretary General.

In 2022, the renewable energy- generating capacity in developing countries has increased by 58% in renewable capacity per capita. However, the international financial flows to developing countries to support renewable energy was 24% lower than in 2018. Despite having progress in 2019 to 2020, there has been recent global events such as the war in Ukraine has impacted global progress in renewable energy and decarbonization transition by having it at a halt or decreasing rather than increasing.

Despite progress, the world is in 2022 not on track to achieve SDG 7. The progress towards SDG 7 has not been faster due to the world entering its third year of COVID-19 along with the highest number of violent conflicts and with the Russian invasion of Ukraine creating one of the largest refugee crises to happen. There are still over 700 million people without access to electricity and about 2.4 billion cooking with harmful fuels that also are polluting the environment. More efforts need to be exerted to improved use of renewable energy and energy efficiency faster. These events has had catastrophic effect the livelihoods of many people and though in 2021, as the global economy started to rebound, these chain of events and negative effects as caused the global economy and progress to SDG 7 and other SDGs to slow down.

According to the 2020 SDG report, affordable and reliable energy is now needed more than ever, especially after the COVID-19 pandemic, to supply hospitals and health facilities as well as access to energy for students learning remotely. Access to electricity has improved strongly in Asia and Latin America, so that an increasing share of people without access live in Sub-Saharan Africa. It is estimated that around 620 million people would still lack access to electricity if the world continues to move at the current pace by 2030.

Challenges 

In 2020, it was reported that many health facilities in developing countries (about 25%) still have no electricity at all or have frequent outages. This was particularly problematic during the COVID-19 pandemic. During the crisis progress has been seen in some aspect of SDG7 such as improvement in energy efficiency, use of renewable energy and increased access to electricity to people.

Links with other SDGs
The SDGs are all interlinked. Energy (or SDG 7) is key to most global issues: this includes poverty eradication (SDG 1), gender equality (SDG 5), climate action (SDG 13), food security (SDG 2), health (SDG 3), education (SDG 4), sustainable cities (SDG 11), jobs (SDG 8) and transport (SDG 9).

SDG 7 and SDG 13 (climate action) are closely related. 

Access to energy is directly related to human development. This is particularly true for women, who spend more of their time collecting fuel and water, and preparing meals. Access to energy would allow them to spend more time on education and work.

According to UN Women, energy interventions that take into perspective women's needs have a significant impact on addressing gender equality and community energy poverty while also ensuring the equal participation of women in energy intervention that in turn benefits the society at large.

Organizations

There are five custodian agencies for SDG 7 which together published the 2020 Energy Progress Report: 
 International Energy Agency (IEA)  
 International Renewable Energy Agency (IRENA)
United Nations Statistics Division (UNSD)
 World Bank (WB) 
 World Health Organization (WHO)

See also 

 Sustainable Energy for All

References

External links
Sustainable Development Knowledge Platform (SDG 7) 
Energypedia - collaborative knowledge exchange on various energy topics in developing countries
Understanding SDG 7
“Global Goals” Campaign - SDG 7
SDG-Track.org - SDG 7
UN SDG 7 in the US

Sustainable development
United Nations General Assembly
Renewable energy
Sustainable Development Goals
United Nations documents
Sustainable energy